Coal Company Store, also known as Independent Order of Red Men Fraternal Lodge, was a historic company store located at Harmony, Clay County, Indiana. It was built in 1880, and was a two-story, rectangular, red brick building with a slate covered gable roof.  It featured round arch window and door openings.  The store operated until 1904, after which it was occupied by a local chapter of the Independent Order of Red Men and later a Baptist church.

It was added to the National Register of Historic Places in 1986 and delisted in 1992.

References

Former National Register of Historic Places in Indiana
Commercial buildings on the National Register of Historic Places in Indiana
Commercial buildings completed in 1880
Buildings and structures in Clay County, Indiana
National Register of Historic Places in Clay County, Indiana
Company stores in the United States
Clubhouses on the National Register of Historic Places in Indiana